A chain gang is a system of labor (usually forced) that involves groups of prisoners chained together doing menial labor.

Chain gang may also refer to:
Chain gang (cycling), a group of cyclists in a close-knit formation, normally for the purposes of training
Chain crew or chain gang, the officials on the sidelines of an American football game who carry the first-down indicators connected by chains
Chain ganging, an elevated probability for inter-state conflict

Literature
 "Chain Gang", a 1978 poem by Patti Smith from Babel

Film, radio and television
The Chain Gang, a 1930 film by Walt Disney starring Mickey Mouse
Chain Gang (1950 film), a film by Lew Landers and starring Douglas Kennedy
Chain Gang (1984 film), a 3D film
The Chain Gang (radio series), a British radio series
"Chain Gang" (Only Fools and Horses), an episode of Only Fools and Horses

Music
Chain Gang (band), an experimental punk rock band from New York City
"Chain Gang" (song), a 1960 song by Sam Cooke
""Chain Gang" (1955 song)", recorded by Bobby Scott and Jimmy Young
"Chain Gang", a song by the Blue Hearts on the b-side of "Kiss Shite Hoshii"
The Chain Gang, a Scottish charity supergroup who released the 1987 single "Makin' Tracks"

See also
"Back on the Chain Gang", a song by the Pretenders
I Am a Fugitive from a Chain Gang, a 1932 American film
"Livin' on a Chain Gang", a song by Skid Row
The Chain Gang of 1974, an indietronica project of Kamtin Mohager